TL–Ultralight is an aircraft manufacturer based in Hradec Králové, Czech Republic. The company started out as a builder of ultralight trikes and now specializes in the design and manufacture of composite ultralight aircraft.

The company is owned by Jiří Tlustý and was founded in 1989.

One of the company's earliest aircraft designs was the TL-22 Duo, a conventional ultralight trike model, that is now out of production.

In 2014 the company's product line included the TL-3000 Sirius and three variants of the TL-2000 Sting: the S3, S4 and RG models.

Aircraft

References

External links

Aircraft manufacturers of the Czech Republic and Czechoslovakia
Ultralight trikes
Homebuilt aircraft